Suhm is a surname. Notable people with the surname include:

 Martin Suhm (born 1962), German chemist and spectroscopist
 Peter Frederik Suhm (1728–1798), Danish historian
 Rudolf von Willemoes-Suhm (1847–1875), German naturalist

See also
 Suh (surname)